Kharino is a rural locality (a village) in Posyolok Nikologory, Vyaznikovsky District, Vladimir Oblast, Russia. The population was 22 as of 2010.

Geography 
Kharino is located 31 km southwest of Vyazniki (the district's administrative centre) by road. Proskuryakovo is the nearest rural locality.

References 

Rural localities in Vyaznikovsky District